Phosphatidylinositol-4-phosphate 3-kinase C2 domain-containing alpha polypeptide is an enzyme that in humans is encoded by the PIK3C2A gene.

The protein encoded by this gene belongs to the phosphoinositide 3-kinase (PI3K) family. PI3-kinases play roles in signaling pathways involved in cell proliferation, oncogenic transformation, cell survival, cell migration, and intracellular protein trafficking. 

This protein contains a lipid kinase catalytic domain as well as a C-terminal C2 domain, a characteristic of Class II PI 3-kinases. C2 domains act as calcium-dependent phospholipid binding motifs that mediate translocation of proteins to membranes, and may also mediate protein-protein interactions. The PI3-kinase activity of this protein is not sensitive to nanomolar levels of the inhibitor wortmannin. This protein was shown to be able to be activated by insulin and may be involved in integrin-dependent signaling.

Clinical significance

Three families have been reported with homozygous loss of function mutations in this gene. The clinical features of this syndrome include short stature, coarse facial features, cataracts with secondary glaucoma, multiple skeletal abnormalities and neurological manifestations. Abnormalities of cilial function were also noted.

References

Further reading

External links